Ali Zitouni (born 11 January 1981) is a Tunisian former footballer who played as a striker.

Career
Zitouni played for Konyaspor in the Turkish Süper Lig. He previously played for Espérance in Tunisia and was loaned to Troyes AC for six months.

Zitouni played for the Tunisia national football team at the 2002 FIFA World Cup finals. He was also a part of the Tunisia squad at the 2004 Summer Olympics, where the team exited in the first round, finishing third in group C, behind group and gold medal winners Argentina and runners-up Australia.

References

External links
 
 
 
 
 
 

1981 births
Living people
Tunisian footballers
Footballers at the 2004 Summer Olympics
Olympic footballers of Tunisia
2002 FIFA World Cup players
ES Troyes AC players
Expatriate footballers in Turkey
Tunisia international footballers
Al Ahli Club (Dubai) players
Antalyaspor footballers
Konyaspor footballers
Footballers from Tunis
Süper Lig players
Tunisian expatriate sportspeople in Turkey
Tunisian expatriate footballers
Tunisian Ligue Professionnelle 1 players
Association football midfielders
Association football wingers
UAE Pro League players
Tunisian expatriate sportspeople in France
Expatriate footballers in France
Mediterranean Games gold medalists for Tunisia
Mediterranean Games medalists in football
Competitors at the 2001 Mediterranean Games
21st-century Tunisian people